Donald Blandford (fl. 1948–1993), a Democrat, was a longtime Kentucky state legislator. He served as Speaker of the Kentucky House of Representatives until his indictment and conviction for bribery.

Blandford was a meat cutter (butcher) who lived in Philpot, Kentucky, and represented the 14th District in the Kentucky House of Representatives from 1968 to 1993. In January 1985 Blandford unseated Speaker of the House Bobby H. Richardson to assume that office himself.

Blandford served as Speaker of the House for eight years, which at the time was a record. He played an essential role in the passage of major education reform legislation in 1990. He was considered a very strong, powerful and influential Speaker.

Operation Boptrot
During the 1992 legislative session the Federal Bureau of Investigation conducted an inquiry and sting operations involving members of the Kentucky House of Representatives and the Kentucky Senate, known as Operation Boptrot. Approximately 10% of the state's sitting legislators were indicted as a result, many for accepting bribes of as low as $100. The probe snared members of both political parties. Blandford was the highest ranking legislator indicted. (The Republican minority leader in the Senate was also indicted and convicted, as were other House members of both parties.) Blandford accepted $500 in cash from former state representative Bill McBee, a lobbyist then representing a Kentucky racetrack.
"Bless your heart", Blandford said when presented with the bribe. The exchange was videotaped and audiotaped by the FBI. Blandford was charged with bribery, and convicted and sent to prison.  (The FBI investigation resulted in 21 convictions overall; most or all of those convicted were sitting legislators, former legislators, or lobbyists.) Blandford resigned his seat in 1993.

In the wake of Blandford's conviction and the scandal that rocked the Kentucky General Assembly as a whole, the House elected Joe Clarke of Danville, the longtime chairman of the Appropriations and Revenue Committee, as Speaker. Clarke's impeccably clean image and sterling reputation for honesty was a marked contrast to that of his predecessor.

References

External links
 Michelle Cottle, "Why Mitch McConnell should know better - campaign fund corruption in his home state of Kentucky", Washington Monthly, October 1997

Criminals from Kentucky
Speakers of the Kentucky House of Representatives
Democratic Party members of the Kentucky House of Representatives
Politicians convicted of extortion under color of official right
Politicians convicted of racketeering
American prisoners and detainees
American butchers
Year of birth missing (living people)
Living people
American government officials convicted of crimes
Kentucky politicians convicted of crimes